Ulla Orring (born 15 September 1926) is a Swedish liberal politician. She is a member of the People's Party which she joined in the 1950s. She served in the Swedish Parliament for many years and was first elected as a deputy in 1985. She served as first vice-chairman of the municipal council in Umeå until 2006 when she resigned from the post.

References

External links

20th-century Swedish women politicians
21st-century Swedish women politicians
1926 births
Living people
Members of the Riksdag 1985–1988
Members of the Riksdag 1988–1991
Members of the Riksdag 1991–1994
Members of the Riksdag 1994–1998
Members of the Riksdag 1998–2002
Members of the Riksdag from the Liberals (Sweden)
Women members of the Riksdag
People from  Umeå